Bow Tie Cinemas is an American movie theater chain, with 7 locations in Colorado, Connecticut,  New Jersey, New York, South Carolina, and Virginia. As of 2013, it is the eighth-largest movie theater chain in the United States and is the oldest, having been founded in 1900. Bow Tie Cinemas is family-owned and has been for four generations.

The company was established by Benjamin S. Moss (1878 - 1951) who opened nickelodeon venues, then shifted to Vaudeville venues, before settling on movie theaters.

History 

B.S. Moss immigrated to the U.S. from Austria in 1900. He opened venues for nickelodeons. He soon changed to operating venues for the Vaudeville circuit and also established a film production company. The film production company produced Margaret Sanger's film Birth Control which was banned from release in New York in 1915. B. S. Moss Motion Picture Company presented Three Weeks (1914) and produced One Day (1916), Boots and Saddles (1916), The Power of Evil (1916), and The Salamander (1916).

B. S. Moss Enterprises operated several movie theaters. In 1910, Moss organized the syndicate that built the $100,000 Washington Theatre at Amsterdam Avenue and 149th Street, known as the first "real" movie palace in New York City. Moss' Vaudeville theaters included Manhattan's Colony Theater, notable for being the venue of several high-profile Disney premieres including Fantasia and Steamboat Willie, the first Disney cartoon to feature Mickey Mouse. 

In the 1930s, Moss decided to focus more on the movie business and phased out his vaudeville program. In 1936, he opened his Criterion Theater in Times Square, which lasted as a successful movie theater until 2000. Since then, Bow Tie Cinemas has continued to concentrate on the presentation of films.

Bow Tie Cinemas

The company changed its name to Bow Tie Cinemas in 2004, upon opening its Criterion Cinemas complex in Downtown New Haven, Connecticut.  The name honors the company's flagship property, located where Broadway and 45th meet in Manhattan, known as the "Bow Tie" of Times Square.  

Bow Tie operates many different types of theaters, from historic in-town cinemas to a 21-screen complex in Richmond, VA.  The company's premium large format auditoriums are known as "BTX - Bow Tie X-Treme(R)".  

In 2017 the company debuted its new "Ultimate" locations in Norwalk, CT, featuring luxury electric recliner seating with an in-theater restaurant and a full bar.  Bow Tie Ultimate(TM) locations feature fresh-baked artisan pizzas, and an array of dining options.  Ultimate locations are now open in Norwalk, CT (Ultimate Royale 6 and Ultimate Regent 8); Trumbull, CT (Ultimate Marquis 16 & BTX); and Annapolis, MD (Ultimate Annapolis Mall 11 & BTX) and Stamford, CT (Ultimate Majestic 6 & BTX).

In spring 2022 seven Bow Tie theaters in Connecticut, upstate New York, and Annapolis, MD were sold to AMC Entertainment. They had previously closed three theaters, one each in Greenwich, New Canaan, and Wilton, CT.

2013 acquisition of Clearview Cinemas 
Clearview Cinemas was a movie theater chain within the New York metropolitan area founded in 1994. From 1998 to 2013, Clearview was a subsidiary of Cablevision. In 2013, Bow Tie Cinemas acquired forty-one Clearview theatres. The forty-second location, the Ziegfeld Theatre in New York City, was retained by Cablevision, but Bow Tie continued to operate the theater until it was closed as a theater in 2016.

References 

Movie theatre chains in the United States
Companies based in Fairfield County, Connecticut
Cinemas and movie theaters in New York (state)
Ridgefield, Connecticut
Entertainment companies established in 1900
1900 establishments in New York City
Family-owned companies of the United States